Flight 751 may refer to:

Real Transportes Aéreos Flight 751, collided with another aircraft on 25 February 1960
Scandinavian Airlines Flight 751, crashed on 27 December 1991
Pegasus Airlines Flight 751, hijack attempted on 7 February 2014

0751